Weedy rice, also known as red rice, is a variety of rice (Oryza) that produces far fewer grains per plant than cultivated rice and is therefore considered a pest. The name "weedy rice" is used for all types and variations of rice which show some characteristic features of cultivated rice and grow as weeds in commercial rice fields. Populations of weedy rice are found in many rice-growing regions. Weedy rice varieties generally have fragile stalks that self-seed before harvest. Variations of weedy rice adapt to a wide range of natural conditions.

Weedy rice grains often have a red pericarp, so for this reason in the international literature the term "red rice" is often used. This term, however, is not all too fitting, because red pericarp is also found in some cultivated varieties, and is absent in many forms of weedy rice.

In most regions of the rice production, weedy rice is introduced after the transition from transplanting rice to sowing commercial seeds directly in the rice field. It has become very significant since the mid-1980s, especially in Europe, with the weak semi-dwarf varieties of indica subspecies. Weedy rice can be found in 40–75% of rice fields in Europe, 40% of fields in Brazil, 55% in Senegal, 80% in Cuba, and 60% in Costa Rica.

Because weedy rice and cultivated rice are so closely related, herbicides that would kill red rice would also kill cultivated rice.  A genetically modified form of cultivated rice has been developed that will resist a herbicide, but this form of rice has not been approved for human consumption. This genetically modified form of cultivated rice has, however, appeared on the rice market.

One way sometimes used for combating weedy rice is to plant a red rice one year and on that land a green rice next year, and so alternating, and in each crop to pull up any rice plants that are the wrong color for that year.

References

Rice varieties